Chalarothyrsus is a genus of flowering plants belonging to the family Acanthaceae.

Its native range is Mexico, particularly Mexico's Central and Southwest regions. The genus was described by German botanist and mycologist Gustav Lindau and was published in Bulletin de l'Herbier Boissier, sér. 2, 4: 327 in 1904. 

Species:
 Chalarothyrsus amplexicaulis Lindau

References

Acanthaceae
Acanthaceae genera